Caripi River (also Curupi) is a river of Amapá state in north-eastern Brazil. The Karipuna do Amapá Amerindians are located on along the river. Manga is the main settlement on the river.

See also
List of rivers of Amapá

References

 Brazilian Ministry of Transport

Rivers of Amapá